Brittoli is a comune and town in the province of Pescara in the Abruzzo region of Italy. It is located in the Gran Sasso e Monti della Laga National Park.

Main sights
Torre of Forca di Penne
Palazzo Pagliccia (17th century)
Abbey of San Bartolomeo, in the nearby commune of Carpineto della Nora

Cities and towns in Abruzzo